Francis Athelstan Baines (1917–1999) was a British composer and double-bass player. He collected "rare and early" musical instruments.

Background 
He taught at the Royal College of Music and performed at the Aldeburgh Festival. His Fanfare was included in Gerard Hoffnung's first Music Festival Concert along with works by the better-known British composers Malcolm Arnold and William Walton. His compositions include two symphonies (from 1953 and 1957), a Divertimento, and a set of Comic Variations. Francis Founded Mary Ward Settlement in London. He took part in a performance of the Schubert "Trout" quintet with Benjamin Britten and the Amadeus Quartet and played nine instruments in a recording of medieval music.

Baines also played the treble viol, and led the Jaye Consort of Viols, which he founded. Baines retired to Harare, Zimbabwe in 1988 and lived there until his death in August 1999. Baines was a fan of cricket, in the 1980s and 1990s he frequently attended games played by the Zimbabwe national cricket team and the Mashonaland Eagles. He travelled to the Emirate of Sharjah in United Arab Emirates to watch the 2nd ODI of the 1998 Coca Cola Champions game between Zimbabwe and Sri Lanka in November 1998, despite being 81 years old at the time. He said he had "a lovely time."

References

External links
Biographical sketch
Baines' photo in National Portrait Gallery

20th-century classical composers
English classical composers
1917 births
1999 deaths
20th-century English composers
English male classical composers
British emigrants to Zimbabwe
20th-century British male musicians
20th-century British musicians